No Fun Mondays is a compilation album of cover songs by Green Day frontman Billie Joe Armstrong, released on November 27, 2020. The project consists of 14 cover songs released during quarantine for the COVID-19 pandemic as part of the "No Fun Mondays" series of songs, in which Armstrong would release a cover song onto the Green Day YouTube channel every so often usually on a Monday as the title suggests.

Recording and release
On March 23, 2020, Billie Joe Armstrong released the first song of the series, "I Think We're Alone Now", on the Green Day YouTube channel, announcing the series at the same time. The description of the video reads "Dear friends.. While we've all been in quarantine I've been reflecting on the things that matter the most in my life. Family, friends and of course music. I recorded a cover of Tommy James and the Shondells "I think we're alone now” in my bedroom. I figure if we have to spend this time in isolation at least we can be alone together. Love BJ." The next week, a cover of "You Can't Put Your Arms Around a Memory" was released and, a week after that, a cover of "Manic Monday" featuring a video appearance from Susanna Hoffs. On October 6, it was announced the series would be released as a 14-track album.

Track listing

Personnel
Musicians
Billie Joe Armstrong – vocals, guitar, bass guitar, and drums
Chris Dugan – drums (tracks 8, 9, and 11)
Bill Schneider – bass guitar (track 8)
Jason White – guitar (track 8)

Technical personnel
Billie Joe Armstrong – production, engineering (including track 11), and drum mixing (track 14)
Chris Dugan – engineering (tracks 9 and 11), drum mixing, and mastering

Charts

References

2020 compilation albums
Billie Joe Armstrong albums
Covers albums